Star Junction Historic District is a national historic district located at Perry Township, Fayette County, Pennsylvania.  The district includes 163 contributing buildings and 2 contributing structures in the bituminous coal mining community of Star Junction. Most of the contributing buildings were built between 1892 and 1918, and 130 of the contributing buildings are two-story, frame duplex workers housing.  The oldest building is the Whitsett farmhouse, built about 1845.  Other buildings and structures include 22 mine manager's dwellings ("Tony Row"), two former mine buildings, two churches, a parsonage, two commercial buildings, a concrete highway bridge (1921), and earthen dam reservoir (c. 1892).

It was added to the National Register of Historic Places in 1997.

Gallery

References

External links
Town of Star Junction, State Route 51, Star Junction, Fayette County, PA: 7 photos, 34 data pages, and 1 photo caption page at Historic American Buildings Survey
Town of Star Junction, State Route 51, Star Junction, Fayette County, PA: 1 photo and 1 photo caption page at Historic American Buildings Survey

Historic American Buildings Survey in Pennsylvania
Historic districts on the National Register of Historic Places in Pennsylvania
Historic districts in Fayette County, Pennsylvania
National Register of Historic Places in Fayette County, Pennsylvania